Harold Cotton may refer to:
Harold Cotton (ice hockey) (1902–1984), Canadian ice hockey player
Harold Cotton (cricketer) (1914–1966), Australian cricketer